Brittons Hill is a Barbados football club, based in Brittons Hill on the southside of Bridgetown in the parish of Saint Michael.

They play their home games in the capital Bridgetown, in the Barbados' first division, the Barbados Premier Division.

They are the only Barbadian club to win promotion to the Premier Division and win the Premier Division in consecutive seasons (1989 and 1990).

Achievements
Barbados Premier Division: 
 1990 Winners, 2009 Winners, 2012 Runners-up, 2013 Runners-up, 2014 Runners-up

Barbados FA Cup: 1
 2007 Winners, 2012 Runners-up, 2013 Runners-up,

References

Football clubs in Barbados